The Metropolitan Opera House (MOH) is an historic opera house in Iowa Falls, Iowa, United States. It was individually listed on the National Register of Historic Places in 1975.  In 2012 it was included as a contributing property in the Washington Avenue Commercial Historic District.

The Metropolitan Opera House was designed by the Omeyer & Thori architecture firm and opened with its first performance on December 27, 1899, with an audience numbering over 800, later proclaimed as the "biggest social event in the history of Iowa Falls." The house hosted notable artists including Otis Skinner, Walker Whiteside, and John Philip Sousa and his band. Between 1930–54, the house presented films and served as a venue for concerts and drama and dance productions of Ellsworth College and Iowa Falls High School. The theatre was purchased by John P. Whitesell of Iowa Falls in June 2013 and reopened after an upgrade to digital projectors.

Oscar-nominated actor Hugh Jackman appeared at The Met's grand re-opening with his family on September 20, 2013. He introduced two of his films — Prisoners and The Wolverine.

References

External links

 Metropolitan Opera House - official site

Music venues completed in 1899
Buildings and structures in Hardin County, Iowa
Opera houses in Iowa
Renaissance Revival architecture in Iowa
Theatres on the National Register of Historic Places in Iowa
Theatres completed in 1899
1899 establishments in Iowa
Tourist attractions in Hardin County, Iowa
National Register of Historic Places in Hardin County, Iowa
Opera houses on the National Register of Historic Places in Iowa
Individually listed contributing properties to historic districts on the National Register in Iowa
Omeyer & Thori buildings